Aphonopelma gabeli is a species of spider in the family Theraphosidae, found in United States (Arizona, southern New Mexico, and west Texas).

References

gabeli
Endemic fauna of the United States
Spiders of the United States
Spiders described in 1995